Dedham Savings is one of the oldest American banks still in operation and one of the oldest banks in the state of Massachusetts still doing business under its original charter.

Deposits at Dedham Savings are insured up to current limits of the Federal Deposit Insurance Corporation, which defines the institution as a community bank. The Depositors Insurance Fund insures all additional balances, up to any amount.

History

Originally founded as Dedham Institution for Savings on March 19, 1831, the bank has a rich history that includes connections to many prominent individuals, both locally and nationally, including Horace Mann. Sophia Foord, an acquaintance of Henry David Thoreau, was the bank's first depositor.
   
 In 1832, one year after opening, the Bank's assets totaled nearly $30,000. 
 Over 100 years later, in 1942, assets were nearly $14 million. 
 In 2020, almost 200 years since the bank's founding, assets totaled over $1.6 billion.

On May 4, 1832, The Society in Dedham for Apprehending Horse Thieves opened a bank account at Dedham Savings. This is the oldest active account at Dedham Savings and may be the oldest continuously active account in the United States.

The founder and first president of the bank was Ebenezer Burgess. An early secretary and treasurer of the bank was George Ellis II.

Mutual Holding Company

On November 15, 2017, the Dedham Savings Board of Corporators, on the recommendation of the Bank's Trustees and Executive Management, voted to approve the formation of 1831Bancorp, MHC. This action received final regulatory approval in February 2018. Also formed was a mid-tier stock holding company called 1831 Bancorp, Inc. The mutuality of Dedham Savings remains intact but resides inside the Mutual Holding Company, the sole owner of the mid-tier holding company, which is the sole owner of the now stock savings bank. This new corporate structure provides the Dedham Savings Board with added flexibility to pursue other banking-related business lines, explore merger and acquisition opportunities with other banks and bank holding companies, and to expand options to raise capital via subordinated capital or debt.

Other banking services

Dedham Savings offers a range of financial and electronic banking services to individuals, businesses and organizations. In addition to an array of banking, lending, and commercial products, the bank began offering investment services in 1992. In 2011, Dedham Savings became a partial owner of Plimoth Trust Company, LLC, the parent company of Plimoth Investment Advisors, a portfolio management firm providing investment management, trust, retirement planning services and estate administration for both private and institutional clients.

Headquarters & locations

The bank was first opened in 1831 at the law office of Treasurer Jonathan H. Cobb at 18 Norfolk Street in Dedham. Three years later, it moved to the basement of the Norfolk County Courthouse. In 1847, it moved to the offices of the Norfolk Mutual Fire Insurance Company at 4 Pearl Street when that building was constructed. It remained there for over 40 years. In the summer of 1892, it opened in a new building the bank constructed at 601-603 High Street. The main branch later moved to 55 Elm Street when the bank built a new, larger building in 1976.

In 1950, the first branch opened in Westwood and the first branch in East Dedham was opened in 1969. Branches were opened in Walpole in 1987, Norwood in 1991, Sharon in 2003, and South Boston in 2016. , the bank also has four limited-service satellite branches inside local senior living facilities.

Dedham Savings Community Foundation

The Dedham Savings Community Foundation is a privately funded foundation created by Dedham Savings in 2000 to provide financial support to charitable organizations that serve disadvantaged populations within the Bank's community reinvestment area. These communities include Dedham, Needham, Norwood, Sharon, South Boston, Walpole, and Westwood and contiguous areas.  Typical requests are received from schools, libraries, family service organizations and non-profit organizations.  The Trustees of the Foundation accept grant requests from community organizations and make awards twice per year.

Notes

References

Works cited

External links 
Homepage
Location on Google Maps

Banks based in Massachusetts
American companies established in 1831
1831 establishments in Massachusetts
Banks established in 1831
Companies based in Dedham, Massachusetts